Jim Krahl (born November 19, 1955) is a former American football defensive tackle. He played for the New York Giants in 1978, the Baltimore Colts from 1979 to 1980 and for the San Francisco 49ers in 1980.

References

1955 births
Living people
American football defensive tackles
Texas Tech Red Raiders football players
New York Giants players
Baltimore Colts players
San Francisco 49ers players